Žilče may refer to:
 Žilče, Jegunovce, North Macedonia
 Sveti Vid, Cerknica, Slovenia